Barony of England,  Bedford, England.

First creation
Created for Paine de Beauchamp, by William Rufus
William de Beauchamp - forfeit for rebelling in the First Barons' War
Faukes de Brent - sent by King John of England to enforce William's forfeit, forfeit himself for rebellion under Henry III of England

Extinct?  Merged?
Merged to Duke of Bedford in 1138, 1366 or 1414

See also
Bedford Castle

Extinct baronies in the Peerage of the United Kingdom
Bedford